Frank Parker Crosse MC (24 October 1897 – 15 March 1979) was a British soldier and Church of England clergyman who became Dean of Grahamstown in South Africa, and was styled  Frank Crosse.

Life 

Educated at the Royal Military College, Sandhurst, early in the First World War Crosse was commissioned as a Second lieutenant into the South Staffordshire Regiment and in 1916 was awarded the Military Cross for conspicuous gallantry.

After the War he trained for the priesthood at Lincoln Theological College, was ordained deacon in 1923 and after a curacy in Bolsover he was vicar at Derry Hill, then at Branksome; and was later Rector of Barlborough and Morton. In 1934 he was appointed as Dean of Grahamstown Cathedral,  also becoming its Archdeacon and Rural Dean.

References

External links 
 National Archives

1897 births
Deans of Grahamstown
Archdeacons of Grahamstown
1979 deaths
Recipients of the Military Cross
Graduates of the Royal Military College, Sandhurst
Alumni of Lincoln Theological College
British Army personnel of World War I
South Staffordshire Regiment officers